The Cerithioidea is a superfamily of marine, brackish water and freshwater gastropod containing more than 200 genera. The Cerithoidea are included unassigned in the subclass Caenogastropoda. The original name of this superfamily was Cerithiacea, in keeping with common superfamily endings at the time.

Ecology 
Cerithioidea is a very diverse superfamily. Its species can be found worldwide mainly in tropic and subtropic seas on rocky intertidal shores, seagrass beds and algal fronds, but also in estuarine and freshwater habitats. The freshwater species are found on all continents, except Antarctica. They are dominant members of mangrove forests, estuarine mudflats, fast-flowing rivers and placid lakes.

Fossil record 
Their fossil record of this superfamily can be traced back as far as the early Triassic but they began radiating mainly during the Cretaceous.

Taxonomy 
The Cerithioidea are presumed to be monophyletic (one lineage). However the phylogenetic relationships between its families are still under investigation because mitochondrial recombinant DNA sequences failed to resolve these questions.

2005 taxonomy 
According to the Taxonomy of the Gastropoda (Bouchet & Rocroi, 2005), the following families are included in Cerithioidea:
 Amphimelaniidae P. Fischer & Crosse, 1891
 Batillariidae Thiele, 1929 - monophyletic
 † Brachytrematidae Cossmann, 1906
 † Cassiopidae Beurlen, 1967
 Cerithiidae Fleming, 1822 - monophyletic
 Dialidae Kay, 1979
 Diastomatidae Cossman, 1894
 † Eustomatidae Cossmann, 1906
 † Ladinulidae Bandel, 1992
 † Lanascalidae Bandel, 1992
 Litiopidae Gray, 1847
 † Maoraxidae Bandel, Gründel, Maxwell, 2000
 Melanopsidae H. Adams & A. Adams, 1854 - freshwater snails, polyphyletic
 Modulidae P. Fischer, 1884
 Pachychilidae P. Fischer & Crosse, 1892
 Paludomidae Stoliczka, 1868
 Pelycidiidae Ponder & Hall, 1983 
 Pickworthiidae Iredale, 1917
 Planaxidae Gray, 1850
 Pleuroceridae P. Fischer, 1885 (1863) - freshwater snails, polyphyletic
 † Popenellidae  Bandel, 1992
 Potamididae H. Adams & A. Adams, 1854 - monophyletic
 † Procerithiidae Cossmann, 1906 - If the genus Argyropeza is placed in the Procerithiidae, then this family is no longer exclusively a family of fossils.
 † Propupaspiridae Nützel, Pan & Erwin, 2002 
 † Prostyliferidae Bandel, 1992
 Scaliolidae Jousseaume, 1912 - monophyletic
 Semisulcospiridae J. P. E. Morrison, 1952
 Siliquariidae Anton, 1838
 Thiaridae Gill, 1871 (1823) - freshwater snails, polyphyletic
 Turritellidae Lovén, 1847 - monophyletic
 Zemelanopsidae Neiber & Glaubrecht, 2019

(Extinct taxa indicated by a dagger, †.)

It is possible that a further detailed examination may show that the polyphyletic families Melanopsidae and Pleuroceridae are one family. There is also a close phylogenetic relationship between the families Modulidae and Potamididae and between the families Cerithiidae and Litiopidae.

2006 taxonomy 
Bandel (2006) made numerous changes in Cerithioidea. He classified superfamily Cerithioidea in the clade Cerithimorpha.

Changes include:

superfamily Cerithioidea
 family Bittiidae Cossmann, 1906 - consider Bittiidae in its own family level. It was as subfamily Bittiinae within Cerithiidae by Bouchet & Rocroi, 2005.
 family † Maturifusidae - moved to Cerithioidea from Hypsogastropoda
 family † Canterburyellidae - moved to Cerithioidea from unallocated Sorbeoconcha
 family † Prisciphoridae - moved to Cerithioidea from unallocated Sorbeoconcha
 family † Zardinellopsidae Bandel, 2006 - new family
 family Pachymelaniidae - considered as valid family. It was as synonym of Thiaridae.
 some Pyrguliferidae members (a synonym) are in Paludomidae and some are in Paramelaniidae (instead of Thiaridae)
 family Paramelaniidae at family level (instead of a synonym of Paludomidae)
 and some moves to other taxa

2009 taxonomy 
 Subfamily Semisulcospirinae within Pleuroceridae was elevated to family level under the name Semisulcospiridae by Strong & Köhler (2009).

2017 Taxonomy
In the updated taxonomy by Bouchet et al. (2017)are listed below:
 Batillariidae 
  † Brachytrematidae  
 Cerithiidae 
 Dialidae 
 Diastomatidae 
  † Eustomatidae 
 Hemisinidae P. Fischer & Crosse, 1891
 † Ladinulidae  
 Litiopidae 
  † Maoraxidae  
 Melanopsidae 
  † Metacerithiidae  
 Modulidae 
 Pachychilidae 
 Paludomidae 
 Pelycidiidae 
 Pickworthiidae 
 Planaxidae 
 Pleuroceridae 
  † Popenellidae  
 Potamididae 
  † Procerithiidae  
  † Propupaspiridae  
  † Prostyliferidae  
 Scaliolidae 
 Semisulcospiridae 
 Siliquariidae 
 Thiaridae 
 Turritellidae 

Unassigned:
 Microstilifer Warén, 1980

The following two extinct families were moved out:
 Lanascalidae  †
 Metacerithiidae  †

References

External links 
 Halder K. & Sinha P. (2014). "Some Eocene Cerithioids (Gastropoda, Mollusca) from Kutch, Western India, and Their Bearing on Palaeobiogeography of the Indian Subcontinent". Paleontology Journal 2014: Article ID 673469, 11 pp. .

 
Sorbeoconcha